The 2013 Under 21 Men's Australian Hockey Championships was a men's field hockey tournament held in the Queensland city of Brisbane.

Queensland won the gold medal after defeating New South Wales 3–2 in the final. Victoria won the bronze medal by defeating South Australia 3–1 in the third and fourth playoff.

Competition format
The tournament is played in a round robin format, with each team facing each other once. Final placings after the pool matches determine playoffs. 

The bottom four teams play in the classification round. Two crossover matches are played, with the fifth placed team playing the eighth place team and the sixth placed team facing the seventh placed team. The winners of the crossover matches progress to the fifth and sixth place playoff, while the losers contest the seventh and eighth place playoff.

The top four teams contest the medal round. Two semi-finals are played, with the first placed team taking on the fourth placed team and the second placed team taking on the third placed team. The winners progress to the final, while the losers contest the third and fourth place playoff.

Teams

  ACT
  SA

  NSW
  TAS 

  NT
  VIC 

  QLD
  WA

Results

Preliminary round

Pool matches

Classification round

Fifth to eighth place classification

Crossover

Seventh and eighth place

Fifth and sixth place

First to fourth place classification

Semi-finals

Third and fourth place

Final

References

External links

2013
2013 in Australian field hockey
Sports competitions in Brisbane